David Kipiani (18 November 1951 – 17 September 2001) was a Georgian football midfielder and manager. Kipiani principally played as a playmaker and is considered one of Georgia's greatest players. He was known for his elegant style of play, dribbling ability and passing range.

Playing career
Kipiani was born in Tbilisi, Georgian SSR. He started playing for the 35th School during the early stages of his career. Kipiani was invited to play for Dinamo Tbilisi in 1967. Due to injuries, he was only able to participate in a single appearances for two season. So, Kipiani went to play for another Tbilisi-based club, Locomotive Tbilisi.

After a successful season with Locomotive, Kipiani was invited back to play for Dinamo again by Gavril Kachalin. Meanwhile, while playing for Locomotive, Kipiani worked with his future manager Nodar Akhalkatsi, under whose managing he later became one of the key figures of Dinamo Tbilisi, which were among the powerful and successful clubs – presented not only at the highest level of Soviet football but internationally by the end of the 1970s and early 1980s. It was a time of the most significant results in the national championship along with the local and international recognition and notable achievements at various prestigious football tournaments.

During the period between 1975 and 1982 – Kipiani was one of the prominent and unanimously recognized leaders of Dinamo Tbilisi, alongside players such as Manuchar Machaidze, Aleksandre Chivadze, Vladimir Gutsaev and Ramaz Shengelia. Georgian team's impressive success against such great football clubs like Liverpool, Inter Milan, Napoli, West Ham United, Feyenoord and others was mainly determined by their obvious personal and professional talent, unique playing abilities and individual skills, great vision of the game, by their exemplary and complete interactions on the football pitch, where Kipiani was probably the most important, illustrious and exquisite player among others.

International career
Kipiani was capped 19 times for the Soviet Union, between April 1974 and May 1981, scoring seven goals. He made his international debut under manager Konstantin Beskov, in a friendly international match on 17 April 1974 in Zenica, when he was a second-half substitute for Vladimir Fedotov. Kipiani has scored his first international goal just after five minutes into his debut for Soviet Team, which became the only goal of the match and Soviet Union beat Yugoslavia 1–0. He played his last national team game on 30 May 1981 in a 1982 FIFA World Cup qualifier against Wales.

Kipiani was not given a chance to play in the World Cup finals. Many think his peak was in 1982, but missed the Spain World Cup and quit playing altogether due to a severe leg injury sustained against FC Kuban Krasnodar on 26 April (Round 4).

Managerial career
After retirement, he coached FC Dinamo Tbilisi, FC Torpedo Kutaisi, Shinnik Yaroslavl (Russia), Racing Mechelen (Belgium), Olympiakos Nicosia (Cyprus) and Georgian National Team.

Death
He died in Tbilisi, Georgia from injuries sustained in a car crash near Tserovani (Mtskheta) on 17 September 2001. He was 49 years old. The Georgian Cup and the David Kipiani Stadium in the town of Gurjaani belong to Alazani Gurjaani, were named after him.

Career statistics

Club

International

Honours

Club
Dinamo Tbilisi
Soviet Top League: 1978
Soviet Cup (2): 1976, 1979
UEFA Cup Winners Cup: 1981

International
Soviet Union
U-19 UEFA Championship: 1976

Manager
Dinamo Tbilisi 
Umaglesi Liga: 1990, 1994–95, 1995–96, 1996–97
Georgian Cup: 1994–95, 1995–96, 1996–97
Torpedo Kutaisi 
Umaglesi Liga: 1999–2000, 2000–01
Georgian Cup: 2000–01

Individual
Soviet Footballer of the Year: 1977
Grigory Fedotov club: 155 goals

References

External links

 
 
 David Kipiani Stock Photos and Images at alamy.com
 David Kipiani Pictures and Images at gettyimages.com
 Article at FC Dinamo Tbilisi Official Club Site
 Profile at FC Dinamo Tbilisi Official Club Site
 Profile at footballtop.com
 
 Article  at GeorgianJournal.ge
 International Statistics at AFS 
 
 
 Profile and statistics at klisf.net
 Articles at Sport-Express.ru
 Profile and Articles at rusteam.permian.ru  
 

1951 births
2001 deaths
Footballers from Tbilisi
Svan people
Association football midfielders
Footballers from Georgia (country)
Football managers from Georgia (country)
Footballers at the 1976 Summer Olympics
Georgia national football team managers
FC Dinamo Tbilisi players
Olympiakos Nicosia managers
Olympic footballers of the Soviet Union
Olympic bronze medalists for the Soviet Union
Road incident deaths in Georgia (country)
Soviet footballers
Soviet football managers
Soviet Union international footballers
K.R.C. Mechelen managers
FC Dinamo Tbilisi managers
FC Shinnik Yaroslavl managers
Russian Premier League managers
Expatriate football managers from Georgia (country)
Expatriate sportspeople from Georgia (country) in Cyprus
Expatriate sportspeople from Georgia (country) in Belgium
Expatriate football managers in Cyprus
Expatriate football managers in Russia
Expatriate football managers in Belgium
Olympic medalists in football
Medalists at the 1976 Summer Olympics
Soviet Top League players